The Palaeologan Renaissance or Palaiologan Renaissance is the final period in the development of Byzantine art. It coincided with the reign of the Palaiologoi, the last dynasty to rule the Byzantine Empire (1261–1453), and essentially preceded and predetermined the Greek and Italian Renaissance. Scholars of the time utilized several classical texts.

History 
The Palaiologoi emperors founded new schools to ensure the survival of traditional culture. John III Doukas Vatatzes (r. 1222–1254) commissioned public libraries in all the cities of his possessions and ordered municipal leaders to allocate salaries to scholars of medicine, mathematics and rhetoric. In 1238, he also instituted a school of philosophy directed by Nikephoros Blemmydes.

Michael VIII (r. 1261–1282) undertook restoration projects on the Blachernae Palace, the Hagia Sophia, several sections of the city defenses along with public service projects. Private patrons did the same for the various churches of the city.

Manuel II (r. 1391–1425) created an institution called the Katholikon Mouseion in the early 15th century. Located in a hospital and attached to the monastery of St. John Prodrome whose rich library had at its disposal numerous teachers including Georges Chrysococè and Cardinal Bessarion who later settled in Italy. The library welcomed many Italians who came to Constantinople to learn Greek language and culture. Also, during the reign of Manuel II, the scholar Demetrios Kydones, wrote several texts such as the Discourses and Dialogues on the relationship between Christianity and Islam, on politics and on civil subjects such as marriage and education. He also made a treatise on the seven ecumenical councils, a poem on how to convert unbelievers, a refutation of Catholic doctrine on the procession of the Holy Spirit.

Notable contributors 

Numerous private persons contributed to the expanding of knowledge in the empire during the time, these include the judge and historian George Pachymeres (1242 – c. 1310), the philologist and theologian Maximus Planude (c. 1255/1260 – c. 1305/1310) who was one of the four great philological scholars of the time of Andronikos II, alongside Thomas Magistros, Demetrius Triclinios and Manuel Moschopoulos. The scholar and statesman Nikephoros Choumnos (c. 1250/1255 – 1327) was one of the most important figures of the renaissance, while the philosopher Theodore Metochites (1270–1332) was a patron of the arts and sciences and was considered the most complete scholar of his time. A tradition of polemic also existed during the time, exemplified by the historian Nikephoros Gregoras, who expanded the criticism of Aristotle in his dialogue Phlorentius. Gemistos Plethon was exiled by Manuel II to the Despotate of Morea (an important intellectual center) from here, he gave numerous lectures that revived Platonic thought in Western Europe. Under the impetus of emperors, many politicians, scholars and writers took part in the literary revival of the time.

Art and architecture 
The majority of scribes who worked on manuscript illumination remain anonymous: only 17 of the 22 manuscripts preserved by Theodore Hagiopetrites (a copyist who lived around 1300 in Thessalonica) are signed. The production of books is rarer, probably because many copyists went into exile under Latin domination. Nevertheless, the scriptoria of the monastery of Panaghia Hodegetria in Constantinople remained active throughout the 14th century.

Chora Church is the typical representative of this art. In essence, this is the second Byzantine Renaissance after the Macedonian Renaissance, which, however, was redefined by the previous Komnenian restoration.

References

Bibliography 

 Fryde, Edmund. The Early Palaeologan Renaissance (1261 – c. 1360). Leiden: Brill, 2000

 Helen C. Evans (Hrsg.): Byzantium. Faith and Power (1261–1557). The Metropolitan Museum of Art, New York 2004.
 Geanakoplos, Deno John. Constantinople and the West: Essays on the Late Byzantine (Palaeologan) and Italian Renaissances and the Byzantine and Roman Churches. Madison: The University of Wisconsin Press, 1989
 Late Byzantium Reconsidered: The Arts of the Palaiologan Era in the Mediterranean, edited by Andrea Mattiello and Maria Alessia Rossi. London: Taylor and Francis, 2019
 Runciman, Steven. The Last Byzantine Renaissance. Cambridge: Cambridge University Press, 2008
 Ševčenko, Ihor. The Palaeologan Renaissance. Palo Alto: Stanford University Press, 1984

Byzantine art
Palaiologos dynasty
Balkan culture